Once in a Blue Moon is an album by the Phil Beer Band released in 2001. It is their latest recorded album using this band name.

The album was a limited edition and is highly rare.

Track listing
 "Frank & Jesse James" (4:21) 
 "Gold Rush/Jakes Jig/Mylor" (6:32) 
 "Border County Town" (3:52) 
 "Poor Old Napoleon" (3:07) 
 "Opinion of Love" (2:59) 
 "Leaving Blues" (4:09) 
 "Devils Right Hand" (2:43) 
 "Adieu Sweet Lovely Nancy" (4:33) 
 "Falmouth Packet/Tipsy Sailor" (3:10) 
 "I Will Always" (4:47) (some other sources state 11:24)
 "Hand On My Heart" (6:36)

There is some confusion over the song "Red River Valley". When it appeared on Phil Beer's Box Set One in 2010, Beer said that it came from Once in a Blue Moon. He further commented, "Trillions of versions of this song exist. Personally I love the Marty Robbins one." However, "Red River Valley" appears on Mandorock.

References

2001 live albums
Phil Beer albums